Megalorhipida paradefectalis is a moth of the family Pterophoridae. It occurs in Himachal Pradesh, India.

References

Oxyptilini
Moths described in 2003
Endemic fauna of India
Moths of Asia